Cherry Hills Country Club is a private country club in the western United States, located in Cherry Hills Village, Colorado, a suburb south of Denver.

Founded  in 1922 and designed by William Flynn, the club features a championship 18-hole golf course, a 9-hole par three course, eight tennis courts, and a lap pool. The nine-hole course is called the Rip Arnold Course, named for the club's head professional from 1939 to 1962. It hosts a pro-member invitational event every September named for Warren Smith, the head pro from 1963 to 1991. A bas relief of Smith, the PGA of America's Golf Professional of the Year in 1973, is near the tenth tee.

The club's signature colors are cherry red and white.

Course

A significant restoration by noted architect Tom Doak was carried out during 2008 and opened for play in spring 2009. 
In addition, several original bunkers that had been removed over the years were restored, bringing the course more in-line with William Flynn's original design.

Notable tournaments

Bolded years are major championships on the PGA Tour.

USGA championships
Cherry Hills has hosted seven United States Golf Association (USGA) championships, including the U.S. Open in 1938, 1960, and 1978. It hosted the U.S. Amateur in 1990, won by Phil Mickelson. The U.S. Senior Open was won by Jack Nicklaus in 1993, and Birdie Kim won the U.S. Women's Open in 2005, holing out from a greenside bunker on the final hole. The U.S. Amateur returned to the club in 2012 and was won by Steven Fox.

U.S. Open
The first of the three U.S. Opens at Cherry Hills in 1938 was won by defending champion Ralph Guldahl. He shot an even-par 284, six strokes ahead of runner-up Dick Metz. In 1960, Arnold Palmer won with 280 (–4), two strokes ahead of the runner-up, amateur Jack Nicklaus. After three unsuccessful attempts (including a double bogey in the first round), Palmer finally drove the first green ( par four) in the fourth round on his way to victory. Tied for the lead with Palmer as he came to the par-5 17th hole, 47-year-old Ben Hogan hit his third shot into the water and bogeyed.  He hooked his final tee shot and triple-bogeyed the final hole to finish four strokes back at even par, which ended his chances of a tenth major championship. Playing with Hogan, 20-year-old collegian Nicklaus from Ohio State bogeyed the final hole and finished second, the obvious low amateur.

As a result of Palmer's feat, the USGA commissioned construction of a new tee prior to the 1978 edition, which extended the hole . The third and most recent Open at Cherry Hills, it was won by Andy North by one stroke with a score of one over par. Until 2006, this was the most recent U.S. Open in which the winning score had been over par.

PGA Championships
Two PGA Championships have been held at Cherry Hills. The first in 1941 was a match play event; Vic Ghezzi defeated defending champion Byron Nelson 1 up in the 36-hole final. Seven of the eight quarterfinalists in 1941 won a major title during their career.

The championship changed to a stroke play format in 1958 and returned to Cherry Hills in 1985; Hubert Green won his second major with a score of 278 (–6), two strokes ahead of defending champion Lee Trevino. As of 2022, it is the most recent major played in the Mountain time zone.

Scorecard

Source:

References

External links

1922 establishments in Colorado
Buildings and structures in Arapahoe County, Colorado
Golf clubs and courses in Colorado
Sports in the Denver metropolitan area
Tourist attractions in Arapahoe County, Colorado